Nemaliales is an order of red algae.

It holds approximately 286 species.

Families
As accepted by AlgaeBase (with amount of species per genus);
 Suborder Galaxaurineae  (117)
Galaxauraceae  - 58 spp.
Scinaiaceae  - 59 spp.
 Suborder Nemaliineae  (14)
Liagoropsidaceae  - 2 spp.
Nemaliaceae  - 9 spp.
Yamadaellaceae  3 spp.

Unplaced;
Liagoraceae  - 152 spp.

References

 
Red algae orders